The Veterinary Council of Ireland,, is a statutory body, the principal function which is to regulate and manage the practice of veterinary medicine and veterinary nursing in Ireland in the public interest. The enabling legislation is the Veterinary Practice Act (SI 22/2005).
The council is made up of nineteen members, of which nine are elected veterinary practitioners, one is an elected veterinary nurse, and nine are appointed nominees of:
 Minister of Agriculture, Fisheries and Food — four members, 
 Minister for Education and Science — one member
 National University of Ireland — two members
 Director of Consumer Affairs — one member
 Food Safety Authority — one member.

The Council is located on Lansdowne Road, Ballsbridge, Dublin.

World Veterinary Year 
In 2011, World Veterinary Year marked 250 years since the establishment of the first veterinary school in France. To celebrate this, the Veterinary Council of Ireland hosted a ceremony on 14 February 2011 in the Royal Dublin Society Concert Hall. One hundred and forty veterinary surgeons who had served the profession on the island of Ireland over the past 50 or more years, including twelve from Northern Ireland, were awarded commemorative medals. The President of Ireland, Mary McAleese, handed the medals to the long-serving veterinary surgeons, including 98 year old Jack Powell, a 1936 graduate.

References

External links
 The Veterinary Council of Ireland
 The Veterinary Practice Act 2005

Veterinary organizations
Government agencies of the Republic of Ireland
Veterinary medicine in Ireland
Seanad nominating bodies